David Miller (born c. 1950), a senior Pitjantjatjara man, is an Australian artist.

His works are held in the collections of the Art Gallery of South Australia (Wati Tjakura Tjukurpa), the University of Canberra (Inarki), and the National Museum of Australia (Googarh).

Miller's work has been exhibited at Royal Museums of Fine Arts of Belgium (Aboriginalities, group).

His work, Goanna Songline (Ngintaka Inma), was projected onto the sails of the Sydney Opera House as part of the 2022 Australia Day Dawn Reflection.

References

Pitjantjatjara people
21st-century Australian painters
Artists from South Australia
Australian male painters
Australian Aboriginal artists

1950 births
Living people
Year of birth uncertain